Tadhg Manley (20 April 1893 – 24 August 1976) was an Irish Fine Gael politician. A teacher by profession, he was an unsuccessful candidate at the 1951 general election. He was elected to Dáil Éireann as a Fine Gael Teachta Dála (TD) for the Cork South constituency at the 1954 general election. He was re-elected at the 1957 general election. He did not contest the 1961 general election.

His nephew Liam Burke was a Fine Gael TD and Senator from 1969 to 2002.

References

1893 births
1976 deaths
Fine Gael TDs
Members of the 15th Dáil
Members of the 16th Dáil
Politicians from County Cork